The California dancer (Argia agrioides) is a damselfly of the family Coenagrionidae, native from Oregon south through California to Arizona, as well as adjacent parts of Mexico.

References

External links
 Argia agrioides at AzOdes

Coenagrionidae
Insects described in 1895